The 2019 Russian Figure Skating Championships were held from 19 to 23 December 2018 in Saransk. Medals were awarded in the disciplines of men's singles, ladies' singles, pair skating, and ice dancing. The results were among the criteria used to select Russia's teams to the 2019 European Championships and 2019 World Championships.

Competitions
In the 2018–19 season, Russian skaters competed in domestic qualifying events and national championships for various age levels. The Russian Cup series will lead to three events – the Russian Championships, the Russian Junior Championships, and the Russian Cup Final.

Medalists of most important competitions

Senior Championships
The 2019 Senior Championships were held in Saransk, Mordovia from 19 to 23 December 2018. Competitors qualified through international success or by competing in the Russian Cup series' senior-level events.

There are three separate basis for qualification.
1. Qualification based on receiving 2018–19 Grand Prix assignment.
2. Qualification based on qualifying for the 2018–19 Junior Grand Prix Final. However, skaters must have been born in 2004 or earlier to be qualified for the Russian senior championships.
3. Qualification based on Russian Cup series' results.

Schedule

Entries
The Russian figure skating federation published the full list of entries on 12 December 2018.

Changes to preliminary entries

Results

Men

Ladies

Pairs

Ice dance

Junior Championships
The 2019 Russian Junior Championships were held in Perm, Perm Krai from 31 January to 4 February 2019. Competitors qualified through international success or by competing in the Russian Cup series' junior-level events. The results of the Junior Championships are part of the selection criteria for the 2019 World Junior Championships.

There are two separate basis for qualification.
1. Qualification based on competing at the 2018–19 Junior Grand Prix series.
2. Qualification based on Russian Cup series' junior-level results.

Schedule

Entries
The Russian figure skating federation published the full list of entries on 30 January 2019.

Changes to preliminary entries

Results

Men

Ladies

Pairs

Ice dance

International team selections

European Championships
Russia's team to the 2019 European Championships was published on 23 December 2018.

Winter Universiade
The list with preliminary entries of the Russia's team to the 2019 Winter Universiade was published on 23 December 2018. The final list was approved on 22 February 2019.

European Youth Olympic Winter Festival
Russia's team to the 2019 European Youth Olympic Winter Festival was published on 1 February 2019.

World Junior Championships
Russia's team to the 2019 World Junior Championships was published on 8 February 2019.

World Championships
Russia's team to the 2019 World Championships was published on 27 February 2019.

World Team Trophy
Russia's team to the 2019 World Team Trophy was published on 26 March 2019.

References

Russian Figure Skating Championships
Russian Championships
Russian Championships
Figure Skating Championships
Figure Skating Championships
December 2018 sports events in Russia
January 2019 sports events in Russia
February 2019 sports events in Russia